The 2015 W-League season was the 21st and last season of the league's existence, and 12th season of second division women's soccer in the United States. The regular season started on May 16 and ended on July 18.

Changes from 2014 season

Teams leaving 
Seven teams folded or self-relegated following the 2014 season:
Bay Area Breeze - San Francisco, California
Gulf Coast Texans - Pensacola, Florida
K-W United FC - Waterloo, Ontario
London Gryphons - London, Ontario
Los Angeles Blues - Los Angeles, California
Ottawa Fury Women - Ottawa, Ontario
Toronto Lady Lynx - Toronto, Ontario

Name changes 
One team changed its name in the off-season:

Standings

Northeastern Conference

Southeastern Conference

Western Conference

Playoffs
The Laval Comets were selected as host for the W-League Championship and gained an automatic berth in the National Semi-Finals. The top regular-season finisher in the Northeastern Conference (other than Laval) and the Southeastern Conference also qualified. The top two finishers in the Western Conference will meet on July 18 for a berth in the Championship.

Western Conference Playoff

W-League Championship

Semi-finals

Third Place Playoff

Championship

Statistical leaders

Top scorers

<small>Source:

Top assists

Source:

|}

Awards
 Most Valuable Player: Tara Andrews (PRI)
 Rookie of the Year: Imani Dorsey (WAS)
 Defender of the Year: Amanda Naeher (CHE)
 Coach of the Year: Marc Mounicot (QUE)
 Goalkeeper of the Year: Britt Eckerstrom (PRI)
 Playoff MVP: Yanara Aedo (WAS)

All-League and All-Conference Teams

Northeastern Conference
F: Shan Jones (LIR) *, Sara Sanau-Ruiz (NYM), Danielle Schulmann (NJV)
M: Kayla Adamek (LAV) *, Serina Kashimoto (NYM), Casie Ludemann (LIR)
D: Sue Alber-Weber (LIR) *, Catherine Chukuka (NJV),  Marie-Sandra Ujeneza (QUE), Kelsey Wilson (LAV) *
G: Rachelle Beanlands (LAV)

Southeastern Conference
F: Leah Fortune (CHE) *, Imani Dorsey (WAS), Ode Fulutudilu (DDL)
M: Alex Brandt (CHE), Megan Dougherty-Howard (WAS) *, Annie Speese (CHE)
D: Savannah McCaskill (CAR) *, Amanda Naeher (CHE) *, Carson Pickett (WAS),  Kaleigh Riehl (BRSE)
G: Robyn Horner-Jones (CHE)

Western Conference
F: Tara Andrews (PRI) *, Celeste Boureille (COR), Kasandra Massey (SCB)
M: Kelly Fitzgerald (COR), Rose Lavelle (SEA) *, Abby Rolph (COS)
D: Sophie Howard (PRI), Morgan Kennedy (COR), Chloe McDaniel (SCB),  Kinley McNicoll (SEA)
G: Britt Eckerstrom (PRI) *

* denotes All-League player

References

USL W-League (1995–2015) seasons
W
2